20th London Film Critics Circle Awards
2 March 2000

Film of the Year:
 American Beauty 

British Film of the Year:
 East Is East 

The 20th London Film Critics Circle Awards, honouring the best in film for 1999, were announced by the London Film Critics Circle on 2 March 2000.

Winners
Film of the Year
American Beauty

British Film of the Year
East Is East

Foreign Language Film of the Year
All About My Mother • Spain

Director of the Year
Sam Mendes – American Beauty

British Director of the Year
Lynne Ramsay – Ratcatcher

Screenwriter of the Year
Alan Ball – American Beauty

British Screenwriter of the Year
Ayub Khan-Din – East Is East

Actor of the Year
Kevin Spacey – American Beauty

Actress of the Year
Annette Bening – American Beauty

British Actor of the Year
Jeremy Northam – Happy, Texas, An Ideal Husband, The Winslow Boy

British Actress of the Year
Emily Watson – Angela's Ashes and Hilary and Jackie

British Supporting Actor of the Year
Michael Caine – Little Voice

British Supporting Actress of the Year
Lynn Redgrave – Gods and Monsters

British Newcomer of the Year
Martha Fiennes – Onegin

British Producer of the Year
Leslee Udwin – East Is East

Dilys Powell Award
Mike Leigh

External links
IMDB
Official Website

References

1
1999 film awards
1999 in London
1999 in British cinema